Coloconger saldanhai is an eel in the family Colocongridae (worm eels/short-tail eels). It was described by J.C. Quéro in 2001. It is a marine eel which is known from New Caledonia.

Etymology
The fish is named in honor of Luiz Saldanha (1937-1997) who collaborated with Quéro and co-discovered this eel.

References

Eels
Taxa named by Jean-Claude Quéro
Fish described in 2001